Vuçak (: , Vučak) is a village in municipality of Drenas, in Kosovo.

Geography

History

Notes 

Notes:

References 

Villages in Drenas